David Overton may refer to:

 David M. Overton (born 1946), founder and chief executive officer of the Cheesecake Factory, Inc.
 David Overton (rowing) (born 1943), Canadian rower